Luke Bedford (born 25 April 1978) is a British composer.

He studied composition with Edwin Roxburgh and Simon Bainbridge at the Royal College of Music, and won the Mendelssohn Scholarship in 2000. This was followed by post-graduate study with Simon Bainbridge at the Royal Academy of Music. In 2007 Bedford signed to Universal Edition London.

Awards include the 2000 Royal Philharmonic Society Composition Prize for composers under 29 and the 2004 BBC Radio 3 Listeners' Award at the British Composer Awards. In 2007, Bedford became the first compositional recipient of a Paul Hamlyn Artists' Award since David Sawer in 1993. 2007 also saw him receive a nomination for the Royal Philharmonic Society large-scale composition prize, for his song cycle On Voit Tout En Aventure. In 2008, Bedford received his second British Composer Award for his 2007 orchestral work Wreathe. In 2012, he was awarded the Ernst von Siemens Composers' Prize.

Bedford was the Wigmore Hall's first ever Composer-in-Residence, from 2008-2011.

In 2015 his work for large orchestra, Instability, was premiered at the Proms, and in October 2017 his Concerto for Saxophone Quartet & Orchestra had its premiere at the Berlin Philharmonie.

Bedford has written two operas, Seven Angels with librettist Glyn Maxwell, and Through His Teeth with David Harrower. Both have received multiple performances both in the UK and Germany. In 2018 Bastille Musique released a studio recording of Through His Teeth, performed by Opera Factory Freiburg.

Luke is married, lives in Shrewsbury, and plays cricket.

Selected works 
Stage
 Seven Angels,  Chamber Opera in 2 acts for 7 singers and 12 instruments (2009–2011)
 Through His Teeth, Opera in 1 act for 3 singers and 8 musician (2013)

Orchestral
 Rode with Darkness (2003)
 Outblaze the Sky (2007)
 Wreathe (2007)
 Più Mosso for large orchestra (2009)
 Instability (2015)
 Concerto for saxophone Quartet and orchestra (2017)

Concertante
 Wonderful Two-Headed Nightingale for violin solo, viola solo and 15 players (2011)

Ensemble
 Five Abstracts for 14 players (2000–2001)
 Catafalque for large ensemble (2002)
 Man Shoots Strangers from Skyscraper for 8 players (2002)
 Slow Music for 8 players (2005)
 Or Voit Tout En Aventure for soprano and 16 players (2006)
 By the Screen in the Sun at the Hill on the Gold for 18 players (2008)
 Self-Assembly Composition No. 1 for any instruments (2009)

Chamber and instrumental music
 Chiaroscuro for violin, cello and piano (2002–2005)
 Of the Air for string quartet (2008–2009)
 Great Bass Rackett for solo bassoon (2009)
 Faraway Canons for piano and bass drum (2018)

Piano
 Catafalque (2002)

Vocal
 Good Dream She Has for soprano, mezzo-soprano, tenor and chamber ensemble (2007)
 On Time for choir and orchestra (2008)
 Upon St. George's Hill for tenor and guitar (2008)

External links 
 Luke Bedford biography and works on the UE website (publisher)
 
 Interview with Luke Bedford, LSO and UBS Sound Adventures
 

1978 births
21st-century classical composers
English classical composers
Living people
People from Wokingham
Alumni of the Royal College of Music
Alumni of the Royal Academy of Music
Mendelssohn Prize winners
International Rostrum of Composers prize-winners
English male classical composers
Ernst von Siemens Composers' Prize winners
21st-century British male musicians